Monroe Township is the name of some places in the U.S. state of New Jersey:
Monroe Township, Gloucester County, New Jersey
Monroe Township, Middlesex County, New Jersey

See also
Monroe Township (disambiguation)

New Jersey township disambiguation pages